Yevgeniya Gennadyevna "Yenia" Burlo (Евгения Геннадьевна Бурло; born 29 May 1988 in Minsk) is a Belarusian group rhythmic gymnast. She represented her nation at international competitions.

She participated at the 2004 Summer Olympics in the group all-around event finishing 4th in the final after finishing 6th in the qualification. 
She competed at world championships, including at the 2005 World Rhythmic Gymnastics Championships in Baku, Azerbaijan.

References

External links
http://burlogymnastics.com/rhythmic-gymnastics-coaches/jenya-burlo-head-coach/

1988 births
Living people
Belarusian rhythmic gymnasts
Gymnasts from Minsk
Olympic gymnasts of Belarus
Gymnasts at the 2004 Summer Olympics
Medalists at the Rhythmic Gymnastics European Championships
21st-century Belarusian women